Microsoft Train Simulator 2 (abbreviated as MSTS 2) was a train simulation game in development by Microsoft Game Studios on two occasions. Meant to be the successor to Microsoft Train Simulator, it was originally announced in 2003, until being cancelled in 2004. It was postponed indefinitely and virtually cancelled due to the closure of Aces Game Studio in 2009.

The second project's lead designer, Rick Selby, announced in late 2008 that it was to be compatible with  Windows XP, Windows Vista and Windows 7. It was being developed by Aces Game Studio (Microsoft Game Studios), known for their long line of Microsoft Flight Simulator games, as a part of the "Games for Windows" initiative. The simulation was to use a modified version of the Flight Simulator X software platform.

2003–2004: First attempt

An earlier attempt at building a successor to Microsoft Train Simulator was originally announced during the Spring of 2003. Many improvements were attempted to make with procedural switches and walking passengers and was again going to be developed by Kuju Entertainment, who were the original creators. On , a preview of the title was shown at the E3 Entertainment Expo in Los Angeles to demonstrate much of the new work, such as its new routes, rolling stock, and other features including animated people and functioning turntables.

Much of the former development team from Kuju later announced Rail Simulator in order to continue development of their own simulation platform. Its first version was published by Electronic Arts in October 2007. Its successor, RailWorks, developed by Rail Simulator Developments (today known as Dovetail Games), was released in June 2009, then RailWorks 2: Train Simulator in October 2010. Since 2012, the series has been known as simply Train Simulator.

2007–2009: Second attempt

This time around the simulation was instead being made in-house by Microsoft's Aces Game Studio, which was most known for its successful Microsoft Flight Simulator series line, as a part of the "Games for Windows" initiative.

Development 
The simulation leveraged most of the existing core components of Microsoft Flight Simulator X's platform, thus providing an entire earth model in which to play from, and was planned to be compatible with both Windows Vista and Windows XP. A post on 'The Little Wheel Goes in Back' blog, written by one of the developers, confirmed the working title was 'Train Simulator 2'.

One of these videos presents a brief demonstration of the simulation's ability to model the entire planet's track corridors, reproducing a similar concept in Microsoft's Flight Simulator series, with global rail network data for anyone to operate their trains around freely without limits. The data would have also been available to route builders for modification of any kind to suit their modeling needs anywhere in the world. As opposed to starting an entire route from scratch, this would require more or less simple cosmetic details and object placement.

Despite having the name in common with its predecessor, backwards compatibility with the first version of Train Simulator would not have been possible due to the completely different base platform used for development and programming designs between the two versions. The original Microsoft Train Simulator uses routes based on individual levels which are loaded separately within the application, whereas this version would have introduced the entire world as a single game playing area where railroad corridors would have been based on their actual real-world locations just as in Flight Simulator.

Routes
In addition to the entire global earth model from which Flight Simulator X was based, Train Simulator 2 was also going to feature four high-detail routes, including the following lines, along with their respective railroad carriers:

Locomotives
The second attempt contained unknown drivable locomotives and multiple units; unknown if MSTS 2 would have featured AI-only trains, or a static in-game number.

Closure of the Aces Game Studio

On , Microsoft announced that it was permanently closing its Aces Game Studio, the internal development studio responsible for the Microsoft Flight Simulator series and the development of Microsoft Train Simulator 2. As a result, all future development on Train Simulator 2 (which was just entering the final stages of development at the time of closure) was immediately halted, marking the second time that this project was terminated. A week later, Microsoft issued the following official announcement from Train Simulator Insider.

Information regarding the product can be found on Microsoft's official Train Simulator website, through the Internet Archive's Wayback Machine.

On , former Aces Game Studio directors, Rick Selby and Kathie Flood, announced the launch of a new simulations-based development studio named Cascade Game Foundry. Their first independent release was a scuba diving simulation game titled Infinite Scuba, released in 2013.

See also
 Rail Simulator – Related product developed by Kuju Entertainment responsible for Microsoft Train Simulator
 List of Games for Windows titles

References

External links
 Train Simulator Insider – Official Microsoft Train Simulator 2 Website
 Rick Selby's PBase Gallery – Pre-Production TS2 Screenshots
 Cascade Game Foundry – The simulation development studio founded by former Aces Game Studio veterans.

Cancelled Windows games
Train simulation video games
Train Simulator 2
Video games developed in the United States